The Brooklyn Bushwicks were an independent, semi-professional baseball team that played its games almost totally in Dexter Park in Queens from 1913 to 1951. They were unique at their time for fielding multi-ethnic rosters. They played what amounts to exhibition games against barnstorming Negro league teams, minor league baseball teams, and other semi-pro teams. The Bushwicks were owned by Max Rosner, who hired many former major league players to play on his club, including Dazzy Vance and others. Many of the famous players of the time came to play exhibitions at Dexter Park including Jackie Robinson, Dizzy Dean, Hank Greenberg, Joe DiMaggio, Satchel Paige, Whitey Ford, Babe Ruth, Lou Gehrig, and Joe Medwick.  Until he became friends with Rosner, Ruth demanded upfront payments in cash before agreeing to personal appearances.  The DiMaggio picture was taken during his debut year with Yankees.

The Bushwicks played in the Serie Interamericana from 1946 to 1950, winning the  tournament 4 times.

The great black stars, Josh Gibson, Cool Papa Bell and many others often opposed the Bushwicks. The team appeared on New York City television and on radio as well. The team's picture appeared in three different Spalding Guides. A book on the Bushwicks by Thomas Barthel entitled, "Baseball's Peerless Semipros: The Brooklyn Bushwicks of Dexter Park," was published in 2009.

Notable players

 Sam Nahem (1915–2004), Major League Baseball pitcher

References 

 

Defunct baseball teams in New York City
Sports in Brooklyn